Bengal is an unincorporated community in Hendricks Township, Shelby County, in the U.S. state of Indiana.

History
A post office was established at Bengal in 1881, and remained in operation until it was discontinued in 1902. The community most likely took its name from Bengal, in Asia. In the 1910s, Bengal had its own high school.

Geography

References

Unincorporated communities in Shelby County, Indiana
Unincorporated communities in Indiana